Mieczysław Rybarczyk (born 1 September 1941) is a Polish former professional tennis player.

Born in Warsaw, Rybarczyk was a member of the Poland Davis Cup team between 1965 and 1970, winning four singles and one doubles rubber. He won two singles rubbers in Poland's 3–2 triumph against Hungary in 1969, when he got the better of István Gulyás and Péter Szőke.

Rybarczyk played in the main draws of both the French Open and Wimbledon during his career. This includes a first round loss to Arthur Ashe at the 1970 French Open.

See also
List of Poland Davis Cup team representatives

References

External links
 
 
 

1941 births
Living people
Polish male tennis players
Tennis players from Warsaw